Events in the year 1912 in Ireland.

Events
 8 February – The First Lord of the Admiralty Winston Churchill addressed a pro-Home Rule meeting in Belfast despite Ulster Unionist attempts to prevent him speaking. He shared the platform with John Redmond, the leader of the Irish Parliamentary Party.  
 31 March – John Redmond, Eoin MacNeill, Patrick Pearse, Tim Healy and others addressed a monster meeting of 200,000 people in favour of Home Rule at the General Post Office, Dublin.
 9 April – 250,000 Orangemen converged on Balmoral Showground in Belfast, declaring that under no circumstances would they accept Home Rule.
 11 April – The Prime Minister of the United Kingdom H. H. Asquith introduced the Third Home Rule Bill in the House of Commons of the United Kingdom.
 12 April – A convention of Sinn Féin delegates led by Arthur Griffith opposed the Home Rule Bill.
 14 April – The , the largest vessel in the world, built in Belfast and making her last call at Queenstown, collided with an iceberg and sank.
 22 April – Englishman Denys Corbett Wilson completed the first aeroplane crossing of the Irish Sea, from Goodwick in Wales to Crane near Enniscorthy.

 26 April – English-born Vivian Hewitt made an aeroplane crossing of the Irish Sea from Holyhead to the Phoenix Park in Dublin.
 30 April – Winston Churchill moved the second reading of the Home Rule Bill at Westminster.
 9 May – The second reading of the Home Rule Bill was accepted in the British House of Commons. A Unionist amendment rejecting the Bill was defeated.
 10 May – At the Royal Albert Hall in London, Bonar Law spoke of Conservative opposition to the Home Rule Bill. Elsewhere Edward Carson also voiced his opposition.
 1 July – A serious outbreak of foot and mouth disease occurred in Counties Dublin, Meath, Kildare and Wicklow.
 July – Prime Minister of the United Kingdom H. H. Asquith travelled to Dublin (the first sitting Prime Minister to do so in over a century; Gladstone had visited Dublin in November 1877 whilst out of office, whilst Arthur Balfour had been Chief Secretary for Ireland) to make a speech, criticising Unionist demands.
 17 July - "A hatchet (around which a text reading 'This symbol of the extinction of the Liberal Party for evermore' was wrapped) was thrown [by a Suffragette] at [ Aquith's] moving carriage as it passed over O’Connell Bridge", striking John Redmond on the arm.
 18 July – Suffragettes attempted an arson attack on the Theatre Royal, Dublin, during Asquith's visit.
 27 July – Bonar Law, leader of the British Conservative Party in opposition, made a defiant speech at a massive Unionist rally at Blenheim Palace against Home Rule, implying support for armed resistance to it in Ulster.
 28 September – 'Ulster Day' – the Ulster Covenant to resist Home Rule was signed by almost 250,000 men throughout Ulster; 229,000 women signed a parallel declaration.
 23 October – Large numbers of cattle were slaughtered in Mullingar due to the outbreak of foot and mouth disease in the area.
 The golden eagle became extinct in Ireland (prior to reintroduction).

Arts and literature
 11 April – Lennox Robinson's play Patriots was first performed, at the Abbey Theatre in Dublin.
 20 April – Bram Stoker, author of Dracula and theatrical manager, died in London.
 November – Lord Dunsany's short story collection The Book of Wonder was published.
 Peadar Kearney and Patrick Heeney's A Soldier's Song (which later became Amhrán na bhFiann, the Irish national anthem) was first published in Irish Freedom by Bulmer Hobson.
 Eleanor Hull published The Poem-Book of the Gael: translations from Irish Gaelic poetry into English prose and verse and first versified the traditional Irish hymn Be Thou My Vision in English.
 Forrest Reid's coming-of-age novel Following Darkness was published.
 James Stephens' novel The Crock of Gold was published.

Sport

Association football

 International
 10 February – Ireland 1–6 England (in Dublin).
 6 March – Ireland 1–4 Scotland (in Belfast)–
 13 April – Wales 2–3 Ireland (in Cardiff)
 Irish League
 Winners: Glentoran F.C.
 Irish Cup
 Winners: Linfield F.C. (last club remaining after several others withdrew)
 Bohemian F.C. were re-admitted to the Irish Football League after resigning the previous year. Tritonville F.C., another Dublin team, joined the League, but lasted just one season.

Gaelic games
 All-Ireland Senior Football Championship 1912 Winners: Louth
 All-Ireland Senior Hurling Championship 1912 Winners: Kilkenny

Olympics
 Ken McArthur, born in Dervock, County Antrim, won the marathon race for South Africa at the 1912 Summer Olympics.

Births
 8 January – James Brophy, cricketer (died 1994).
 5 February – Desmond Surfleet, cricketer (died 2006).
 14 February – Joseph Brennan, Fianna Fáil party Teachta Dála (TD), Cabinet minister and Ceann Comhairle of Dáil Éireann (died 1980).
 22 March – Wilfrid Brambell, actor (died 1985).
 12 April – Gerald Goldberg, lawyer, Fianna Fáil party politician and first Jewish Lord Mayor of Cork (died 2003).
 27 April – Tommy Breen, international association football player (died 1988).
 29 April – Terence de Vere White, lawyer, novelist, and biographer (died 1994).
 9 June – Patrick Mulligan, Bishop of Clogher 1970–1979 (died 1990).
 12 July – Mick Mackey, Limerick hurler and first recipient of the All-Time All Star Award (hurling) (died 1982).
 26 July – Niall Sheridan, poet, fiction writer and broadcaster (died 1998).
 9 August – Alex Stevenson, association football player (died 1985).
 18 September – Denis Farrelly, Fine Gael party TD and senator (died 1974).
 12 November – Donagh MacDonagh, writer and judge (died 1968).
 1 December – Micheál Cranitch, Fianna Fáil party politician, Cathaoirleach of Seanad Éireann in 1973 (died 1999).
 25 December – Mícheál Ó Móráin, Fianna Fáil party TD and Cabinet minister (died 1983).
 Full date unknown
 Brendan Menton Snr, association football administrator and president of the Football Association of Ireland (died 2002).
 Denis O'Conor Don, hereditary chief of the O'Conor Don sept (died 2000).
 Tommy Potts, fiddle player (died 1988).
 Jimmy Warnock, boxer (died 1987).

Deaths
 30 January – John Philip Nolan, soldier, landowner, and politician (born 1838).
 21 February – Osborne Reynolds, engineer and prominent innovator in the understanding of fluid dynamics (born 1842).
 20 April – Bram Stoker, writer and author of Dracula (born 1847).
 24 April – Justin McCarthy, politician, historian, and novelist (born 1830).
 28 April – Michael Thomas Stenson, politician in Canada (born 1838).
 19 December – Thomas Brennan, a founder and joint first secretary of the Irish National Land League (born 1853).
 Full date unknown
 Henry Allan, painter (born 1865).

References

 
1910s in Ireland
Ireland
Years of the 20th century in Ireland
Ireland